Abir Mukherjee (born circa 1974) is a British-Indian author best known his Wyndham and Banerjee series of crime novels set in Raj-era India.

Personal life 
Mukherjee's parents moved from Calcutta, India to the United Kingdom before he was born. He grew up in Scotland and now lives in Surrey, England with his wife (Sonal) and two sons.

Career 
Before beginning his writing career, Mukherjee was an accountant for 20 years.

In 2013, at age 39, Mukherjee learned that Lee Child didn't begin writing until age 40 and was inspired to begin writing himself. He began writing A Rising Man in September of that year, partly inspired by the Telegraph Harvill Secker Crime Writing Competition, which he won the following year. The novel was ultimately published in 2016.

Mukherjee's Wyndham series is based in Raj-era India. He has stated that this era of colonization in India intrigues him because he didn't learn about it in British schooling, and the stories his parents shared about India differed significantly from what he learned in the classroom.

Awards

Publications

Wyndham and Banerjee series 

 A Rising Man (2016)
 A Necessary Evil (2017)
 Smoke and Ashes (2018)
 Death in the East (2019)
 The Shadows of Men (2021)

References 

British crime writers
British historical fiction writers
1970s births
Living people
British writers of Indian descent